Mahonia subimbricata is a shrub in the Berberidaceae described as a species in 1948. It is endemic to China, known from Guangxi and Yunnan Provinces.

References

subimbricata
Endemic flora of China
Shrubs
Plants described in 1948